This is a list of Brazilian television related events from 1989.

Events

Debuts

Television shows

1970s
Turma da Mônica (1976–present)

1980s
Xou da Xuxa (1986-1992)
Tieta (1989-1990)

Ending this year

Births
3 March - Arthur Aguiar, actor, singer-songwriter, and former swimmer
28 May - Rafael Almeida, actor and singer-songwriter

Deaths

See also
1989 in Brazil